Basse Terre is French for "low ground".

It may refer to:

 Basseterre, the capital of the Federation of Saint Kitts and Nevis in the West Indies
 Basse-Terre, the capital city of Guadeloupe, an overseas région and département of France, located in the Lesser Antilles
 Basse-Terre Island, the name of the western half of Guadeloupe